International Association of Machinists v. Street, 367 U.S. 740 (1961), was a United States labor law decision by the United States Supreme Court on labor union freedom to make collective agreements with employers to enroll workers in union membership, or collect fees for the service of collective bargaining.

Facts

Judgment
The Supreme Court held that "a union may constitutionally compel contributions from dissenting nonmembers in an agency shop only for the costs of performing the union's statutory duties as exclusive bargaining agent."

See also
US labor law
 Duplex Printing Press Co. v. Deering
 List of United States Supreme Court cases, volume 367

Further reading

External links
 

United States Supreme Court cases
United States Supreme Court cases of the Warren Court
United States labor case law
1961 in United States case law
International Association of Machinists and Aerospace Workers